Macau competed at the 2004 Summer Paralympics in Athens, Greece. Macau's delegation consisted of only one competitor. Macau held a flag raising ceremony at the Paralympic Village on 12 September.

Sports

Athletics

Men's track

See also 
Macau at the Paralympics

References 

Nations at the 2004 Summer Paralympics
2004
2004 in Macau sport